The current Malaysian Director General of Education is Pkharuddin Ghazali, since 23 September 2022.

List of Director General of Education 

The following is a list of former and current Director General of Education.

References

Government of Malaysia
Ministry of Education (Malaysia)